("The Dawn") is a Ladino or Judaeo-Spanish monthly newspaper published in Istanbul.

History 
Historically, the Jewish weekly newspaper in Turkey was written exclusively in Ladino, but in 1984 it switched to Turkish, except one page in Ladino a week. It has a circulation of 6,000 readers.

See also 
 Aki Yerushalayim, an Israeli magazine in Judaeo-Spanish published 2–3 times a year in Jerusalem

References

External 

 Official website (English)
 Official website (Ladino)

Newspapers published in Istanbul
Jewish newspapers
Judaeo-Spanish-language newspapers
Publications established in 2003
Jewish Turkish history
2003 establishments in Turkey
Jews and Judaism in Istanbul
Sephardi Jewish culture in Turkey